Nová Ves nad Lužnicí is a municipality and village in Jindřichův Hradec District in the South Bohemian Region of the Czech Republic. It has about 300 inhabitants.

Administrative parts
The village of Žofina Huť is an administrative part of Nová Ves nad Lužnicí.

References

Villages in Jindřichův Hradec District